The Puerta del Cambrón is a gate located in the west sector of the Spanish city of Toledo, in Castile-La Mancha. Also called previously "Gate of the Jews" or "Gate of Saint Leocadia", has been speculated The possibility that the name of the gate, del Cambrón, had its origin in the growth of a thorn bush or plant at the top of the ruins of one of the towers, before the last reconstruction of the gate, In 1576. It has the cataloging of Bien de Interés Cultural.

Features 
Of Renaissance style, has two pairs of towers and two arches, being built of stone and brick. It underwent two renovations in the early-1570s and in 1576. Hernán González, Diego de Velasco and Juan Bautista Monegro would sculpt a figure of Leocadia in the gate. The gate was little damaged during the Spanish Civil War.

Notes

References

Bibliography 
  Text, but not this edition, is in the public domain.

External links 

Gates in Toledo, Spain